MAPS Perak (Movie Animation Park Studio of Perak) is a theme park in Ipoh, Perak, Malaysia which was created from a joint venture between Perak Corporation Berhad and the Sanderson Group. It was originally planned to be opened in 2015, but the opening date was delayed to 26 June 2017. The theme park is the first fully animation-based theme park in Asia which contains attractions based on animations such as DreamWorks Animation and The Smurfs and was built at the cost of RM520 million. It houses both international and homegrown (Malaysian) Intellectual Properties including DreamWorks characters, The Smurfs and BoBoiBoy and have more than 40 attractions in six themed zones.

On January 28, 2020, the theme park was temporarily closed.

History timeline
MAPS Perak was announced in early 2014 and was panned to be opened in 2015 but the opening date was postponed. In April 2017, the theme park was said to have 96 percent of its construction completed. and was opened on 26 June 2017 soon after its completion.

Location
MAPS Perak is located at Persiaran Meru Raya 3, Bandar Meru Raya, 30020 Ipoh, Perak, Malaysia.

Characters
 BoBoiBoy
 The Smurfs

Attendance and operations
MAPS Perak management claims that the monthly visitors number up to 50,000 visitors however this was only noted in its first month of operations in 2017. State Assemblyman for the Canning Wong Kah Koh was reported to have said daily attendance to MAPS only numbered up to 200 people. The operations of the park are further hampered with the delays of Dreamzone, which eventually resulted in the termination of licensing agreement with DreamWorks

References

2017 establishments in Malaysia
Amusement parks in Malaysia
Defunct amusement parks in Malaysia
Buildings and structures in Perak
History of Perak